La Chica Dorada (English: The Golden Girl) is the debut solo studio album by Mexican singer Paulina Rubio, released on October 20, 1992, by EMI Capitol de México. The album was produced and directed by Miguel Blasco, and written mostly by José Ramón Flórez, Gian Pietro Felisatti and Cesar Valle. Most of the album's composition is primarily "a light and danceable pop", although it includes some elements of pop rock, new jack swing, new wave and a couple of ballads. The album's title has been stuck as Rubio's nickname throughout the Spanish-speaking world ever since.

The album received a mixed reception from music critics. Many critics applauded the album for its interesting themes and her step forward "from girl to woman" in the music industry, while others focused heavily on her conceptual image, who noted the influence of Marilyn Monroe and Madonna —Although her greatest inspiration was Brigitte Bardot—, and they did not like another "Madonna wannabe". Despite mixed reviews, commercially the album was a success. It includes Rubio's signature song and single that launched her solo career, "Mío", along with the number-one hits, "Sabor a Miel" and "Amor de Mujer". In Mexico, the album was certified triple gold, selling 450,000 copies in the nation.

In the United States, the album peaked at position number forty two on the Billboard Top Latin Albums chart, but it peaked the number two on the Latin Pop Albums chart. The singles "Mío", "Amor de Mujer" and "Abriendo las Puertas al Amor" entered the top-ten of the Hot Latin Songs chart, turning Rubio into a strong promise of Hispanic music.

Background and development
In the 1980s, Rubio established herself as one of the prominent members of the Mexican pop group Timbiriche. She recorded eleven albums overall, of which seven were certified platinum and four were certified gold. When she decided to leave the group In 1990, she try to set up her solo music career. Meanwhile, Rubio traveled to Europe to study History of Art. Upon her return to Mexico she spoke with her mother, the actress Susana Dosamantes, to support her in financing her first debut album. Rubio traveled to Madrid, Spain in September 1991 to meet up with the 80's and 90's hit-makers producers Miguel Blasco—who began to guide her to establish her solo project—and José Ramón Flórez, and search record labels for a contract. While Rubio recording some songs for her debut solo studio album, she anticipated want to show "fresh music for a very broad market.", and also announced she would film her second telenovela in Mexico, Baila Conmigo.

In mid-1991, Rubio begun to work with Miguel Blasco, and the well-known producers and songwriters, includes Gian Pietro Felisatti (better known as "DiFelisatti") and Cesar Valle, had a good relationship with Rubio, since both writers were responsible for great successes of the band Timbiriche. Added to the above, the Mexican singer and songwriter Aleks Syntek as well was composer for the album. The album was primarily recorded at Balu-Balu Estudios in Madrid, Spain.

In June 1992, Paulina Rubio officially signed a contract with the EMI Capitol label in Mexico and the song "La Chica Dorada" was released on airplay radio in Mexico exclusively to publicize her solo project. The song describes the moments Rubio lived in Spain while studying Art History and dreamed of becoming a Latin pop star.

Composition
La Chica Dorada is primarily a pop and dance-pop record, incorporated new wave music, new jack swing and pop rock styles. Also, it included a couple of ballads. The album's texture has been described as "light." The album opens with "Mío", a "dancefloor thumper" song includes a flamboyant saxophone insert on the bridge and ends with electric guitar riffs. It contains a soul chorus and new wave influences. Lyrically, it "reflected the anxiety of owning everything."  The synth arrangements "Dime Si Soy Sexy" notes a girl who is desired by men because of her prominent beauty through a squeaky funny saxophone. "Sabor A Miel" is a sentimental track, talking about a lost love. The romantic ballad song incorporates a waltzing tempo and refined violins. Rubio has cited it as the most personal song on the album.

Written by Aleks Syntek, the guitars-crying style-old West, "El Primer Amor", describing what Rubio is prepared to do for her inexperienced lover, if this one wanna be her first love. The secuence pop-rock style, "Amor De Mujer" describe the feelings and mood of a woman in love. It is considered Rubio's first feminist anthem. It starts with a sequence of hurried keyboards and continues with a rhythm of drums and electric guitars. The beats of both live and programmed drums song "La Escoba" is a studio-live track with audience clapping and whistles originally sung by the Spanish rock group Los Sírex.

Beginning with a guitars riffs introduction, the album title track "La Chica Dorada" is a doo-wop-oriented song. It has harmonies beneath the main chorus, resembles the songs of early Sixties girl groups. The lyrics narrate Rubio's long and winding road to stardom to become "The Golden Girl". The emotional ballad "Abriendo Las Puertas Al Amor" explores Rubio vocal range with a chorus vocal harmonies. It starts like a piano ballad and culminates with light touches of drums. In the new jack swing cut "Sangre Latina", the singer raps narrating a surreal idyll about a walk she takes through various Mexico city locations looking beautiful, capturing the glances and attention of the men, and citing among them renowned cultural figures such as Juan Gabriel, Pancho Villa and Hernán Cortés. The album closes with its tenth track "Amarte En Libertad", a pop-rock with new jack swing and new wave influences.

Released and promotion
The promotion began in July 1992, when Rubio conducted a small advertising campaign by several Mexican media outlets, where she presented her new image as "golden girl" and promoted the song "La Chica Dorada" on some radio stations. The singer made several promotional appearances, including talk shows and live performances in the main cities of Mexico. Paulina Rubio made her debut as a solo singer on the legendary Mexican television program Siempre en Domingo, with Raúl Velasco on October 18, 1992, 3 days before her album was released. With her mother and grandmother in the audience, she performed the song "Amor De Mujer" and her first single, "Mío". Rubio's wearing a gold, glitter mini skirt, cropped top and jacket, while a straight out of a rotating device to begin her performing. The famous television host commented that "it was a great privilege to have presented Paulina as a solo singer". Her presentation had a high audience rating that the next week she was invited again. In United States, for the Spanish-language television program Sábado Gigante, Rubio performed the track "Mío" in January, 1993 and that presentation opened the doors to the Hispanic market in that country. She also appeared on the 1993 Calle Ocho Festival of Miami where performing "Abriendo Las Puertas Al Amor".

Rubio comeback to Mexico in March 1993 to performed at the Premios ERES where performed "Mío Extended Pop Mix",  and also performed "Amor De Mujer The Wedding Dance Mix" in a medley with "Mío" at the 11th TVyNovelas Awards. She received the Female Singer Revelation of the Year award in that ceremony.

Singles
"La Chica Dorada" was often aired on radio airplay in Mexico for two months to generate interest in the singer and the album. It, however, was only a Mexican release and was not part of her single debut project. "Mío" was serviced as the lead single from the album and featured lyrics written by José Ramón Flórez and Cesar Valle. The producer of the album Miguel Blasco, thought that Paulina should transmit a more sophisticated and sexy image, and that reflected in her debut single. It received positive reviews from music critics and peaked number three on US Billboard Hot Latin Track. Additionally, it became Rubio's first great hit to obtain commercial success in Latin America. "Amor De Mujer", the second single in Mexico released in November 1992, reached number eight in the Hot Latin Tracks. The song established La Chica Doradas success and was her second number one single in Mexico.

Rubio re-released "Abriendo Las Puertas Al Amor" in April 1993 in Latin America. It was released as the album's second single in US and became the highest entry of the Latin singles chart by a female artist with the singles and debut album. "Sabor A Miel", the fourth single in US, was a success in Mexico, where was number one and was also embraced as a highlight from the album. "Amarte En Libertad" was exclusively released in Latin America as the airplay single in July 1993, and the song was the prelude to Rubio's second album, 24 Kilates, which would be published only 4 months later.

Additional releases
The first singles of La Chica Dorada were repackaged as a maxi-single album entitled Paulina Rubio in countries like Mexico and Ecuador in 1993, with additional mixes of the singles "Mío" and "Amor De Mujer". In the Ecuador edition it was launched with the promotion of the third single from the album, "Sabor A Miel". The album has been digitally remastered from the original studio tapes. They were available in vinyl, 12" and CD.

Critical reception

La Chica Dorada had received mixed reviews from music critics. AllMusic rateit three of five stars, giving it a mixed review and considering the album energetic, exuberant, passionate and intense in the same way Rubio's aesthetic image and personality. Due to the success of "Mío", in Mexico the journalists considered her solo debut as the new "Latin pop icon" and a great business for her label EMI/Capitol Latin. In a retrospect review, Apple Music considers "is an album with a risky musical proposal that transcends".

El País newspaper's Elena Reina wrote in an article that "[Rubio] turn from adolescence to the age of majority to hit new record. If her image had already been important to her career as a child, now [with her debut] it becomes crucial", ultimately concluding that the album was her passage from girl to woman. Catalan music critic and journalist Jordi Bianciotto categorized La Chica Dorada as "a light and danceable pop record" and expressed his "disconcerting version" of "La Escoba", which was originally sung by the Spanish rock group Los Sírex. Similarly to most critics, he highlighted Rubio's commercial success with her debut.

Commercial performance
La Chica Dorada debuted on the USA Latin Pop Albums Chart in January 1993. In its eighth week, it peaked at number two and stayed there for two consecutive weeks. Rubio became the first Mexican female artist to have a success album with her debut as solo artist on Billboard charts; in doing so, She was also the first member of Timbiriche who managed to enter those lists. The album also peaked at number 42 on the Top Latin Albums chart where it stayed on the charts for 3 weeks.

In Mexico, the album had sold over 450,000 copies.

Accolades

 Track listing 

Personnel
The following people contributed to La Chica Dorada:

Paulina Rubio – lead vocals, backing vocals, main performer, songwriterAdditional personnel'
Miguel Blasco – music director, executive producer
Luis Méndez – A&E
Remy Causse – arrangements
J.R. Florez – record producer, composer
Cesar Valle – composer
Gian Pietro Felisatti – composer
Aleks Syntek – composer
José Antonio Álvarez Alija – engineering
Carlos Latapí L – photography

Charts

Certifications and sales

Release history

See also
1990s in music
1992 in Latin music
Honorific nicknames in popular music

References

Bibliography

External links 

1992 debut albums
Paulina Rubio albums
Spanish-language albums
EMI Latin albums
EMI Records albums